Mansfield Street (officially in ) is a north-south commercial street located in Downtown Montreal, Quebec, Canada. It is situated two blocks from Peel Street and links Sherbrooke Street in the north to Saint-Antoine Street in the south.

History
Constructed around 1845 by James Smith and Duncan Fisher, Mansfield Street was named for William Murray, 1st Earl of Mansfield (1705-1793), a Lord Chief Justice of the King's Bench.

Points of interest
Central Station
Queen Elizabeth Hotel
Place Ville-Marie
Centre Mont-Royal

Further reading 
 Ville de Montréal. Les rues de Montréal. Répertoire historique. Montréal,Méridien, 1995, p. 332-333

Streets in Montreal
Downtown Montreal